Dremiel Byers (born September 11, 1974) is an American former wrestler in the Greco-Roman discipline. Byers joined the World Class Athletes Program (WCAP) in 1996 and was the 2002 World Champion in Greco-Roman wrestling at 120 kg. In total, Byers won three World medals and was a two-time Olympian. He was inducted into the National Wrestling Hall of Fame as a Distinguished Member in 2021.

Early life and education
Dremiel Byers was born in Newark, New Jersey. He was raised by a single mother in Kings Mountain, North Carolina. Byers carries a childhood nickname, "Bam" or "Big Bam" to the current day. Byers earned this nickname from when he was a toddler, carrying a 1-pound dumbbell as a toy. 
He attended Kings Mountain High School, where he was an All-State wrestler, and the 1993 North Carolina heavyweight wrestling state champion.

Byers attended North Carolina A&T for one year on a football scholarship. Byers studied Animal Science. He was forced to give up his scholarship to take care of family matters. After giving up his scholarship, he signed a 2-year enlistment for the US Army.

Wrestling career
Byers Senior level wrestling career started after he joined the World Class Athletes Program (WCAP) in 1996. He competed out of Colorado Springs, Colorado for the US Army, in the 120 kg (264.5 lbs) weight class. During his career he had many accomplishments and awards as a wrestler. He was recognized as the USA Wrestling Greco-Roman Wrestler of the Year in 1999, 2002 and 2009. 

Byers would earn a gold medal in Greco-Roman at the 2002 World Wrestling Championships. He also helped the United States win its first Greco-Roman World team title at the 2007 World Wrestling Championships. Byers finished his career tied with Matt Ghaffari for the most Greco-Roman World Championship medals by a United States wrestler, by achieving three medals at the World Championships.

Personal life
Byers is an avid motorcyclist. He is a member of the motorcycle club Street Soldierz out of Denver, Colorado and is the Colorado Springs Chapter commander. Byers is a Sergeant First Class in the US Army.

References

External links
http://www.themat.com/section.php?section_id=3&page=showarticle&ArticleID=22129
http://www.krdo.com/news/report-springs-poaching-suspect-is-soldier-olympian/27507860
http://wrestling.teamusa.org/athletes/dremiel-byers
http://www.army.mil/olympics/2008/bios/byers.html
https://sports.yahoo.com/olympics/beijing/usa/dremiel+byers/220319
https://web.archive.org/web/20110902213851/http://www.2008.nbcolympics.com/athletes/athlete=1091/bio/index.html

1974 births
Living people
Sportspeople from Newark, New Jersey
American male sport wrestlers
Wrestlers at the 1999 Pan American Games
Wrestlers at the 2007 Pan American Games
Wrestlers at the 2008 Summer Olympics
Wrestlers at the 2012 Summer Olympics
Olympic wrestlers of the United States
Pan American Games medalists in wrestling
Pan American Games silver medalists for the United States
Medalists at the 1999 Pan American Games
Medalists at the 2007 Pan American Games
U.S. Army World Class Athlete Program